The 2012 Robert Morris Colonials football team represented Robert Morris University in the 2012 NCAA Division I FCS football season. They were led by 19th-year head coach Joe Walton and played their home games at Joe Walton Stadium. They are a member of the Northeast Conference. They finished the season 4–7, 3–5 in NEC play to finish in a tie for sixth place.

Schedule

Source: Schedule

References

Robert Morris
Robert Morris Colonials football seasons
Robert Morris Colonials football